This article is about the particular significance of the year 1890 to Wales and its people.

Incumbents

Archdruid of the National Eisteddfod of Wales – Clwydfardd

Lord Lieutenant of Anglesey – Richard Davies 
Lord Lieutenant of Brecknockshire – Joseph Bailey, 1st Baron Glanusk
Lord Lieutenant of Caernarvonshire – John Ernest Greaves
Lord Lieutenant of Cardiganshire – Herbert Davies-Evans
Lord Lieutenant of Carmarthenshire – John Campbell, 2nd Earl Cawdor
Lord Lieutenant of Denbighshire – William Cornwallis-West    
Lord Lieutenant of Flintshire – Hugh Robert Hughes 
Lord Lieutenant of Glamorgan – Christopher Rice Mansel Talbot (until 17 January); Robert Windsor-Clive, 1st Earl of Plymouth (from 26 June)
Lord Lieutenant of Merionethshire – Robert Davies Pryce
Lord Lieutenant of Monmouthshire – Henry Somerset, 8th Duke of Beaufort
Lord Lieutenant of Montgomeryshire – Edward Herbert, 3rd Earl of Powis
Lord Lieutenant of Pembrokeshire – William Edwardes, 4th Baron Kensington
Lord Lieutenant of Radnorshire – Arthur Walsh, 2nd Baron Ormathwaite

Bishop of Bangor – James Colquhoun Campbell (retired in April) Daniel Lewis Lloyd (from 24 June) 
Bishop of Llandaff – Richard Lewis
Bishop of St Asaph – Alfred George Edwards (from 25 March)
Bishop of St Davids – Basil Jones

Events
6 February - In a gas explosion at Llanerch Colliery, Pontypool, 176 miners are killed.
10 March - In a gas explosion at Morfa Colliery, Port Talbot, 86 miners are killed.
7 April - An Easter Monday conference at Llangefni leads to agreement with employers on a shorter working day for male agricultural labourers.
13 April - At a by-election in Caernarfon, David Lloyd George wins the seat for the Liberals from the Conservatives, defeating H. J. E. Nanney, the local squire; Lloyd George remains the constituency MP until his death in 1945.
22 May - Y Cymro is launched by Isaac Foulkes (Llyfrbryf) in Liverpool as a liberal weekly Welsh language "national newspaper for Welshmen at home and abroad"; it is published until 1909.
Summer - Queen Elisabeth of Romania visits Llandudno, staying for five weeks and later remembering it as "a beautiful haven of peace"; the phrase is later translated into Welsh and used as the town's motto.
21 December - Beginning of a 3-week period of severe winter weather causing deaths and disruption to daily life in many parts of Wales.
Opening of the Rock Mill watermill for woollen milling at Capel Dewi, Llandysul.

Arts and literature

Awards
National Eisteddfod of Wales  - held at Bangor
Chair - Thomas Tudno Jones, "Y Llafurwr" 
Crown - John John Roberts, "Ardderchog Lu'r Merthyri"

New books
Rhoda Broughton - Alas!
Arthur Machen - The Great God Pan (in the magazine The Whirlwind)

Music

Events
The National Musical Association of Wales is formed, with Joseph Parry as a sponsor.

Works
John Thomas Rees - "Duw sydd noddfa"

Sport
Cricket - The England ladies' team plays an exhibition match at Newport.
Football - The Welsh Cup is won by Chirk for the third time.
Hockey - The Welsh Hockey Association is founded.
Rugby union - Wales win their very first international against England. The only try was scored by Cardiff's 'Buller' Stadden.

Births
2 January - Madoline Thomas, actress (died 1989)
21 January - Jack Anthony, jockey (died 1954)
14 February - Nina Hamnett, artist and Bohemian (died 1956)
1 March - Jack Beames, rugby player (died 1970)
16 February - Thomas Ifor Rees, diplomat (died 1977)
20 April - Ernest Roberts, politician (died 1969)
5 May - George Littlewood Hirst, Wales international rugby player (died 1967)
14 June - Dai Hiddlestone, Wales international rugby player (died 1973)
21 June - W. J. A. Davies, rugby player (died 1967)
28 July - Horace Thomas, Wales international rugby player (died 1916)
30 August - Llewelyn Wyn Griffith, novelist (died 1977)
13 September - Johnny Basham, boxer (died 1947)
19 September - Jim Griffiths, politician, first Secretary of State for Wales (died 1975)
22 November (in Lancashire) - Harry Pollitt, Communist trade union leader and parliamentary candidate for Rhondda East (died 1960)
6 December - Dion Fortune, born Violet Firth, English occultist and novelist (died 1946)
16 December - P. J. Grigg, politician (died 1964)

Deaths
17 January - Christopher Rice Mansel Talbot, landowner, industrialist and politician, 86
20 January - Guillermo Rawson, Argentinian politician and patron of Patagonian Welsh colony, 68
4 March - Henry Davies, journalist, publisher and librarian, 86 
19 March - Edmund Swetenham, MP for Caernarfon, 67
8 April - William Jones, Army officer, 81/2 
21 March - Benjamin Thomas Williams, politician, 57
29 June - Henry Herbert, 4th Earl of Carnarvon, 59
12 July - David Pugh, politician, 84
20 July - David Davies "Llandinam", industrialist, 71
6 August - Thomas Babington Jones, cricketer, 39
10 October - Charles Herbert James, politician, 73
27 October - Enoch Salisbury, barrister, politician and bibliophile, 70
unknown date - John Cambrian Rowland, painter, 70

References

 
Wales